Lakesar (also Romanized as Lākesār, Lakasar, Lāksār, and Leaksar) is a village in Hend Khaleh Rural District, Tulem District, Sowme'eh Sara County, Gilan Province, Iran. At the 2006 census, its population was 525, in 146 families.

References 

Populated places in Sowme'eh Sara County